Douglas Lee Dorman (September 15, 1942 – December 21, 2012) was an American bass guitarist best known as a member of the psychedelic rock band Iron Butterfly. After replacing Jerry Penrod following Iron Butterfly’s debut album, Dorman had four stints with the group; 1967 to 1971, 1977 to 1978, 1978 to 1985, and from 1987 until his death in 2012. Shortly after his first departure from Iron Butterfly in 1971, Dorman co-founded the band Captain Beyond with ex-Deep Purple lead vocalist Rod Evans, Dorman’s Butterfly band mate Larry Reinhardt, and  Bobby Caldwell. Dorman was raised in St. Louis, Missouri, and moved to San Diego in the 1960s. He began playing bass guitar in his teens.  While recording In-A-Gadda-Da-Vida, Dorman assisted Erik Brann with the arrangement of Brann's song "Termination," and was given a co-writing credit.

Dorman died of natural causes in his car in Laguna Niguel, California on December 21, 2012. He was the second member of the In-A-Gadda-Da-Vida lineup, preceded by Erik Brann and succeeded by Ron Bushy, to die.

References

External links

1942 births
2012 deaths
Musicians from St. Louis
American rock bass guitarists
American male bass guitarists
Iron Butterfly members
Captain Beyond members
Guitarists from Missouri
20th-century American bass guitarists
20th-century American male musicians